The James Madison Dukes football statistical leaders are individual statistical leaders of the James Madison Dukes football program in various categories, including passing, rushing, receiving, total offense, defensive stats, and kicking. Within those areas, the lists identify single-game, single-season, and career leaders. The Dukes represent James Madison University (JMU) in the NCAA Division I FBS Sun Belt Conference.

James Madison began competing in intercollegiate football in 1972.  These lists are dominated by more recent players for several reasons:
 While the NCAA organizes an FCS championship tournament, currently called the NCAA Division I Football Championship, it did not include I-AA/FCS playoff games toward official season statistics until the 2002 season. From that time through their final FCS season in 2021, the Dukes reached the playoffs 13 times, giving many recent players extra games to accumulate statistics.
 Due to COVID-19 issues, the NCAA ruled that the 2020 season would not count against the athletic eligibility of any football player, giving everyone who played in that season the opportunity for five years of eligibility instead of the normal four.

These lists are updated through the end of the 2022 season.

Passing

Passing yards

Passing touchdowns

Rushing

Rushing yards

Rushing touchdowns

Receiving

Receptions

Receiving yards

Receiving touchdowns

Total offense
Total offense is the sum of passing and rushing statistics. It does not include receiving or returns.

Total offense yards

Defense

Interceptions

Tackles

Sacks

Kicking

Field goals made

References

James Madison